Dysschema is a genus of tiger moths in the family Erebidae. The genus was erected by Jacob Hübner in 1818. The genus contains some of the more showy moths of the southwestern United States.

Species

Dysschema amphissum
Dysschema arema
Dysschema boisduvalii
Dysschema brunnea
Dysschema buckleyi
Dysschema centenaria
Dysschema centenarium
Dysschema cerialis
Dysschema constans
Dysschema dissimulata
Dysschema eurocilia
Dysschema fanatica
Dysschema fantasma
Dysschema fenestrata
Dysschema flavopennis
Dysschema forbesi
Dysschema formosissima
Dysschema hilarum
Dysschema humeralis
Dysschema hyalinipennis
Dysschema innominatum
Dysschema intermedium
Dysschema jansonis
Dysschema larvata
Dysschema leda
Dysschema leucophaea
Dysschema luctuosum
Dysschema lunifera
Dysschema lycaste
Dysschema lygdamis
Dysschema magdala
Dysschema marginalis
Dysschema marginata
Dysschema mariamne
Dysschema minor
Dysschema modesta
Dysschema montezuma
Dysschema moseroides
Dysschema neda
Dysschema on
Dysschema palmeri
Dysschema perplexum
Dysschema pictum
Dysschema porioni
Dysschema practides
Dysschema practidoides
Dysschema rorata
Dysschema rosina
Dysschema sacrifica
Dysschema salome
Dysschema schadei
Dysschema semirufa
Dysschema subapicalis
Dysschema superior
Dysschema terminata
Dysschema thetis
Dysschema thyridinum
Dysschema tricolora
Dysschema umbra
Dysschema unifascia
Dysschema viuda
Dysschema zeladon

References

"Dysschema". Entomologische Arbeiten.

 
Pericopina
Moth genera